Erin Fehlau (born 1973 in Massachusetts) is the weekday morning news anchor for WMUR in Manchester, New Hampshire.  Fehlau also hosts NH Chronicle alongside WMUR's Sean McDonald.  In 2020, she and the station were honored with a Granite Award.

In an earlier job at WPXT in Portland, Maine, Fehlau broke the news about George W Bush's drunk driving arrest. For her reporting, she won the National Clarion Award and the station won a regional Edward R. Murrow Award.

During Fehlau's college career at Syracuse University, she anchored "SunUp," a weekly morning news program airing on the college's TV station, UUTV.

References

 

1973 births
Living people